The Royal Yacht Squadron is a yacht club on the Isle of Wight in England.

Royal Yacht Squadron may also refer to:

 Royal Melbourne Yacht Squadron
 Royal New Zealand Yacht Squadron
 Royal Nova Scotia Yacht Squadron
 Royal Queensland Yacht Squadron
 Royal Sydney Yacht Squadron

See also
 Royal Barcelona Maritime Club
 Royal Dutch Sailing & Rowing Club
 Royal Ocean Racing Club
 Royal Yacht Club (disambiguation)
 Royal Yachting Association